Bad Movie, also known as Timeless, Bottomless Bad Movie, is a 1997 South Korean docudrama film directed by Jang Sun-woo.

Upon its initial release in South Korea, around thirty minutes of footage was censored due to objectionable material; this footage was restored in overseas releases.

Synopsis
A semi-documentary shot with amateur actors depicting various episodes from the violent lives of marginalised and homeless youth in Seoul.

Cast
Hang Seul-ki (한슬기)
Park Kyeong-won (박경원)- as "prince"
Lee Jae-kyeong (이재경)
Jang Nam-kyeong (장남경)- as "bird"
Byeon Sang-gyu (변상규)- as "Red byeon(Bloodshit)"
 Song Kang-ho
 Gi Ju-bong
 Ahn Nae-sang
 Lee Moon-sik - as convenience store owner

Awards
 Pusan International Film Festival (1997) Netpac Award
 Tokyo International Film Festival (1997) Asian Film Award

Notes

Bibliography

External links 
 
 

1997 films
1990s Korean-language films
Films directed by Jang Sun-woo
South Korean documentary films
1997 documentary films